The Third Gate is the fifth solo novel by American writer Lincoln Child. The novel was released on June 12, 2012 by Doubleday. The book is also the third installment in the Jeremy Logan series.

Plot
Shortly after the events of Terminal Freeze, Dr. Jeremy Logan is contacted by an old colleague named Dr. Ethan Rush, who invites him on an expedition into the Sudd in southern Egypt. The expedition, led by famed archaeologist Dr. Porter Stone, seeks to finally locate and excavate the long-lost tomb of the ancient Egyptian pharaoh Narmer, located at the bottom of the swamp. Other members of the expedition include the head of security Frank Valentino, technician Cory Landau, archaeologist Tina Romero, and mechanic Frank Kowinsky. Also accompanying the expedition is Rush's wife Jennifer, who has been maintaining a special connection to "the other side" after a near-death experience where she technically died in a car crash, but was revived by her husband. Rush uses his special method of hypnosis to put Jennifer into a lucid state through which they can communicate with the spirits within the tomb below them, which they believe to be that of Narmer himself. The base of operations is a massive group of canvas-covered outposts floating in the middle of the Sudd, simply referred to as "The Station."

Once they finally manage to create a passageway down to the tomb entrance—nicknamed the Umbilical Cord—they slowly begin excavation through the first two chambers, known as the Gates, with the Third Gate containing the tomb of Narmer himself, while the first two Gates contain rooms full of treasure. However, when Romero studies the mummified remains within the Third Gate, she realizes that the remains are of a female body. Logan similarly draws a conclusion based on the mannerisms Jennifer displayed whenever possessed by the spirit, and deduces that it has to be a female spirit inhabiting her during the sessions, not that of a man. Thus, they realize that Narmer's queen, Niethotep, must have killed Narmer by poisoning him and taking his place in the tomb.

Shortly after this discovery, Jennifer is fully possessed by the spirit of Niethotep once more, which then sabotages the ventilation system on the base and starts a fire in the engine room. She then takes two cylinders of nitroglycerin and uses one to damage the Umbilical Cord, killing Kowinsky, while holding the second one in her hand to keep everyone at bay. Valentino orders an evacuation of the Station, with most personnel taking as much treasure with them as possible, and escapes in one of the rafts along with Stone, Romero, and Landau. Logan and Rush stay behind to try to bring back Jennifer Rush and cast out the evil spirit of Niethotep, but they are unsuccessful in doing so; Niethotep throws the final canister of nitroglycerin down between her and Rush, creating an explosion that kills both of them while narrowly sparing Logan. Logan grabs a handful of treasure and escapes on one of the final rafts before the base explodes and sinks into the Sudd.

Reception

—Review by Examiner.com

References to other literary works
Near the beginning, when Logan first arrives at the base, Dr. Stone mentions that it is simply called "The Station," after the location of the same name in Heart of Darkness.
Near the climax, shortly before Landau barely survives his encounter with the possessed Jennifer Rush, he finishes reading The House on the Borderland.

References

External links
Official website

Novels by Lincoln Child
American science fiction novels
American thriller novels

2012 American novels
Doubleday (publisher) books